Alajos Szilassy (19 October 1907 – ?), also known as Alajos Szymiczek, was a Hungarian rower. He competed at the 1936 Summer Olympics in Berlin with the men's coxed four where they came fifth.

References

1907 births
Year of death missing
Hungarian male rowers
Olympic rowers of Hungary
Rowers at the 1936 Summer Olympics
Sportspeople from Oradea
European Rowing Championships medalists